Vladimir Malevich (born July 2, 1985) is a Russian professional ice hockey defenceman currently playing for HC Donbass in the Ukrainian Hockey League.

Malevich played with HC Vityaz Podolsk of the KHL during the 2012–13 season.

References

External links

1985 births
Living people
Amur Khabarovsk players
Arlan Kokshetau players
Atlant Moscow Oblast players
HC Donbass players
HC Khimik Voskresensk players
Metallurg Zhlobin players
HK Mogilev players
HC Neftekhimik Nizhnekamsk players
Russian ice hockey defencemen
Rubin Tyumen players
Severstal Cherepovets players
HC Sochi players
Torpedo Nizhny Novgorod players
Traktor Chelyabinsk players
HC Yugra players
HC Vityaz players
People from Amur Oblast
Sportspeople from Amur Oblast